Korfi or Koryfi (Κορυφή Peak) is a village in the Limassol District of Cyprus, located 4 km south of Limnatis.

References

Communities in Limassol District